California Health Care Facility (CHCF) is a state prison for incarcerated patients with long-term medical needs or acute mental health needs. The prison is located in Stockton, California, on the site of the former Karl Holton Youth Correctional Facility. Incarcerated people of all security levels are treated at the facility.

Facilities and programs

The 61-building medical complex was built in response to two federal class action civil rights lawsuits (Plata v. Schwarzenegger and Coleman v. Schwarzenegger), after which a federal court in Sacramento ruled that the California Department of Corrections and Rehabilitation's medical and mental health services violated the Eighth Amendment to the United States Constitution's prohibition on cruel and unusual punishment. The facility cost $839 million to construct and employs approximately 4,000  custody, medical and support staff.

Facilities include a diagnostic center, dental clinic, dialysis clinic, memory care center, and palliative care unit. CHCF provides both inpatient and outpatient medical and mental health treatment.

As of April 30, 2020, CHCF was incarcerating people at 93.2% of its design capacity, with 2,751 occupants.

Notable events

In March of 2019, CDCR confirmed a patient who had been incarcerated at CHCF and died tested positive after death for Legionnaires' disease. After additional testing of patients with pneumonia, one additional patient tested positive for Legionnaires' disease and was treated at the facility. In response to the outbreak, CHCF temporarily shut off some water access, including showers, and instead provided bottled water for drinking and hygiene.

Notable inmates
Billy Mansfield, serial killer
Robert Durst, real-estate heir; convicted of murder (died in 2022 during the pendency of appeals)
John Getreu, serial killer
Manuel Moore, one of the "Zebra" murderers; died in 2017 in custody
Herbert Mullin, serial killer; died in 2022 in custody
Phil Spector, record producer and convicted murderer; died in 2021 in custody
Hans Reiser, computer programmer and convicted murderer
Big Lurch, former rapper and convicted murderer.

See also 
 List of California state prisons

References

External links
 California Health Care Facility official website
 Carnival helps those in Memory Care Unit

Stockton, California
2013 establishments in California